Disinformation is the deliberate dissemination of false information.
A Disinformation attack may involve specific types of tactics and goals, which can be countered.
Disinformation may also refer to:

 Disinformation (album), a 1999 album by Tin Huey
 Disinformation (TV series), a Channel 4 television series
 Disinformation (company), an American publishing company
 Disinformation (book), a 2013 book by Ronald Rychlak and Ion Mihai Pacepa
Dezinformatsia (book), a 1984 book by Richard H. Shultz and Roy Godson
 Disinformation (Sinplus album), 2012

See also
 Misinformation